This is a list of cases reported in volume 296 of United States Reports, decided by the Supreme Court of the United States in 1935 and 1936.

Justices of the Supreme Court at the time of volume 296 U.S. 

The Supreme Court is established by Article III, Section 1 of the Constitution of the United States, which says: "The judicial Power of the United States, shall be vested in one supreme Court . . .". The size of the Court is not specified; the Constitution leaves it to Congress to set the number of justices. Under the Judiciary Act of 1789 Congress originally fixed the number of justices at six (one chief justice and five associate justices). Since 1789 Congress has varied the size of the Court from six to seven, nine, ten, and back to nine justices (always including one chief justice).

When the cases in volume 296 were decided the Court comprised the following nine members:

Notable Cases in 296 U.S.

Pacific States Box and Basket Company v. White
Pacific States Box and Basket Company v. White,  296 U.S. 176 (1935), arose after The Oregon Division of Plant Industries, having been granted the power to prevent fraud or deception and to promote, protect, further or develop the horticultural interests of the state, prescribed the type, size and shape of containers for the sale of strawberries and raspberries. A California manufacturer of fruit and vegetable containers challenged the rule as arbitrary and capricious in violation of the Due Process Clause of the Fourteenth Amendment to the United States Constitution. On appeal, the Supreme Court held that "where the regulation is within the scope of authority legally delegated, the presumption of the existence of facts justifying its specific exercise attaches alike to statutes, to municipal ordinances, and to orders of administrative bodies." The case served as a precursor to Administrative Procedure Act rationality review.

Fox Film Corporation v. Muller
In Fox Film Corporation v. Muller,  296 U.S. 207 (1935), the Supreme Court held that it cannot exercise certiorari jurisdiction over a case in which there is an adequate and independent state law ground for the state court's final judgment.

United States v. Constantine
United States v. Constantine,  296 U.S. 287 (1935), concerned liquor laws and taxation. Congress placed a tax on liquor dealers who violated state liquor laws. The Supreme Court struck down the relevant portion of the Revenue Act of 1926 as an attempt to punish a state violation through taxation. The Court ruled that the primary purpose of the tax law was to enforce federal police powers, and not to raise revenue. After repeal of the Eighteenth Amendment, the federal law was no longer enforceable. The Supreme Court's opinion in National Federation of Independent Business v. Sebelius (2012) referenced the logic of Constantine in determining whether the Affordable Care Act was a penalty or a tax in terms of the Constitution; the Court held it was a tax, after "[d]isregarding the designation of the exaction, and viewing its substance and application".

Federal court system 

Under the Judiciary Act of 1789 the federal court structure at the time comprised District Courts, which had general trial jurisdiction; Circuit Courts, which had mixed trial and appellate (from the US District Courts) jurisdiction; and the United States Supreme Court, which had appellate jurisdiction over the federal District and Circuit courts—and for certain issues over state courts. The Supreme Court also had limited original jurisdiction (i.e., in which cases could be filed directly with the Supreme Court without first having been heard by a lower federal or state court). There were one or more federal District Courts and/or Circuit Courts in each state, territory, or other geographical region.

The Judiciary Act of 1891 created the United States Courts of Appeals and reassigned the jurisdiction of most routine appeals from the district and circuit courts to these appellate courts. The Act created nine new courts that were originally known as the "United States Circuit Courts of Appeals." The new courts had jurisdiction over most appeals of lower court decisions. The Supreme Court could review either legal issues that a court of appeals certified or decisions of court of appeals by writ of certiorari. On January 1, 1912, the effective date of the Judicial Code of 1911, the old Circuit Courts were abolished, with their remaining trial court jurisdiction transferred to the U.S. District Courts.

List of cases in volume 296 U.S. 

[a] Hughes took no part in the case
[b] McReynolds took no part in the case
[c] Stone took no part in the case

Notes and references

External links
  Case reports in volume 296 from Library of Congress
  Case reports in volume 296 from Court Listener
  Case reports in volume 296 from the Caselaw Access Project of Harvard Law School
  Case reports in volume 296 from Google Scholar
  Case reports in volume 296 from Justia
  Case reports in volume 296 from Open Jurist
 Website of the United States Supreme Court
 United States Courts website about the Supreme Court
 National Archives, Records of the Supreme Court of the United States
 American Bar Association, How Does the Supreme Court Work?
 The Supreme Court Historical Society